On November 4, 2014, Illinois voters approved the Illinois Right to Vote Amendment, a legislatively referred constitutional amendment to the Constitution of Illinois. The amendment was designed to provide that no person shall be denied the right to register to vote or cast a ballot in an election based on race, color, ethnicity, language, national origin, religion, sex, sexual orientation or income.

Both proponents and opponents argued that the legislation was intended to block voter identification laws from being passed in Illinois.

Passage in the legislature
Before it could be to be referred to the voters, the amendment needed to be approved by a joint resolution of the Illinois Legislature, receiving the affirmative vote of 60% of the members of each chamber.

In the legislature, the bill's primary sponsor was Michael Madigan, Speaker of The Illinois House of Representatives. It was additionally sponsored by State Representatives Barbara Flynn Currie, Fred Crespo, Jim Durkin, William Davis, Marcus C. Evans Jr., Mary E. Flowers, La Shawn Ford, Jack D. Franks, Mattie Hunter, Lou Lang, Linda Chapa LaVia, Kimberly Lightford, Camille Lilly, Christian Mitchell, Anna Moeller, Emanuel Chris Welch, Kwame Raoul, Carol Sente, Elgie Sims, Derrick Smith, Andre Thapedi, Arthur Turner, Patricia Van Pelt and State Senators Jacqueline Y. Collins, Napoleon Harris, Toi Hutchinson, Emil Jones III, Donne Trotter.

The bill passed the Illinois House of Representatives on April 8, 2014 by a vote of 109–5. The five "nay" votes came from Republicans Brad Halbrook, Jeanne Ives, Tom Morrison, David Reis, and Michael W. Tryon. The bill passed the Illinois Senate on April 10, 2014  by a unanimous vote of 52–0.

Constitutional changes
The measure added a Section 8 to Article III of the Constitution of Illinois which reads,

Referendum
The amendment was referred to the voters in a referendum during the general election of 2014 Illinois elections on November 4, 2014.

Ballot language
The ballot question read,

Endorsements

Results
In order to be approved, the measure required either 60% support among those specifically voting on the amendment or 50% support among all ballots cast in the elections. The measure ultimately achieved both.

References

Right to Vote Amendment
Right to Vote Amendment
Voting in the United States
Right to Vote Amendment